Laevimon is a genus of freshwater crabs, found in Vietnam.  Data are deficient concerning their IUCN Red List of Threatened Species status.

Species
 Laevimon kottelati Yeo & Ng, 2005
 Laevimon tankiense (Dang & Tran, 1992)

References

External links

Potamoidea
Freshwater crustaceans of Asia